Hassett is an Irish surname and may refer to:

People
 Betsy Hassett (born 1990), New Zealand association football player
 Billy Hassett (1921–1992), American basketball player
 Brenna Hassett, American British bioarchaeologist
 Buddy Hassett (1911–1997), American baseball player
 Francis Hassett, Australian general
 Gavin Hassett (born 1973), Canadian rower
 Joe Hassett (born 1955), American basketball player
 John Hassett (disambiguation)
 Kevin Hassett (born 1962), American economist and Chair of the Council of Economic Advisers
 Liam Hassett (born 1975), Irish footballer
 Lindsay Hassett (1913–1993), Australian cricketer
 Marilyn Hassett (born 1947), American screen and television actress
 Matt Hassett (born 1932), Irish sportsperson and lawyer
 Thomas Hassett, escaped prisoner during the Catalpa rescue
 Scott Hassett

Other uses
 Hassett, Nova Scotia, Canada

See also
 Haskett, a surname
Hasset, California